The 1985 World Health Organization AIDS surveillance case definition was developed in October 1985, at a conference of public health officials including representatives of the Centers for Disease Control (CDC) and World Health Organization (WHO) in Bangui, Central African Republic. For this reason, it became known as the Bangui definition for AIDS.  It was developed for use in countries where testing for HIV antibodies was not available.

It stated the following:

Exclusion criteria
 Pronounced malnutrition
 Cancer
 Immunosuppressive treatment

The diagnosis of AIDS is established when the score is 12 or more.

Revision

The 1985 WHO AIDS surveillance case definition was heavily criticised, for both medical and political reasons. The 1994 expanded World Health Organization AIDS case definition was introduced in 1994 to incorporate the statement that HIV testing should be done.  However, if testing was unavailable, then the Bangui definition should be used.

References
 Source:HIV infection and AIDS in the developing world

World Health Organization
History of HIV/AIDS